Peroz ("the Victor") was king of Gogarene and Gardman, ruling from 330 to 361. He was the founder of the Mihranid dynasty, an offshoot of the House of Mihran, one of the seven Parthian clans.

He was the son-in-law of Mirian III, a convert to Christianity, who belonged to the Chosroid dynasty, which was also an offshoot of the House of Mihran. Peroz eventually himself converted to Christianity during his rule in Caucasus. Peroz later died in 361, and was succeeded in Gardman by his son Khurs, and in Gogarene by an unnamed son, who was later succeeded in 394 by Bakur I.

Sources 
 

 

4th-century Iranian people
4th-century monarchs in Asia
361 deaths
Mihranids
Year of birth unknown
Zoroastrian rulers
Vassal rulers of the Sasanian Empire
Converts to Christianity from Zoroastrianism
Christians in the Sasanian Empire
Princes of Gardman